Engineers Country Club is a historic country club located in Roslyn Harbor, New York, on the historic Gold Coast on the north shore of Long Island.

History
The club has an 18-hole championship golf course which hosted the PGA Championship in 1919 and the United States Amateur Championship in 1920. The competitions were won by Jim Barnes and Chick Evans, respectively. Herbert Strong was the architect of the original golf course and Devereux Emmet remodeled part of the course in 1921.
  
The golf course was constructed on the former grounds of the W. R. Willet Manor estate. The property was purchased by the Engineers Country Club in March 1917, which had been formed on January 21, 1917 by the Engineers Club of Manhattan.The first round on the newly constructed course was played on June 29, 1918. The first foursome out consisted of club president B. G. M. Thomas, vice president Nat M. Garland, Frank Dupont, chairman of the Building Committee, and T. I. Jones, one of the governors. After completion of his round, Garland described the 18th green as "sui generis, rara avis ... in a class by itself".

The signature 14th hole, which for a time had been abandoned, has now been reintegrated to the main golf course and is open for play.  This short  par three with a classic postage stamp green was dubbed the "Two or Twenty Hole" due to the fact that in 1919 Bobby Jones and Gene Sarazen both took double figures on the tricky hole. There is a sign near the tee box referring to the difficulties Jones and Sarazen experienced while playing the hole.

In August 1920 a sports writer said, "No young club in the history of golf, let it go back 400 years, has come in for as much discussion and comment as Engineers. The main nerve test will be on the greens. You will find strong men weeping as they finish a round."

In July 1924, prior to the playing of the Metropolitan Open at Engineers Country Club, golf writer George Trevor of the Brooklyn Daily Eagle described the golf course:

Since 1998 the club has completed major renovations to update its facilities. In 2004, club president Jonathan Gold stated, "We became kid-friendly about six years ago. We built a kiddie pool and playground, and we hold events such as carnivals. Making it attractive for children is a big draw. We are relaxing a lot of the age-old rules that have been part of these old-time country clubs that would frown on kids under a certain age."

In 2018, Engineers Country Club was sold to RXR Realty.

References

External links 

  Official site
 Engineers Country Club on GolfClubAtlas.com

Roslyn Harbor, New York
Golf clubs and courses in New York (state)
Sports venues in Long Island
Sports venues in Nassau County, New York
Town of North Hempstead, New York
Golf clubs and courses designed by Devereux Emmet